was a district located in Okayama Prefecture, Japan.

As of 2003, the district had an estimated population of 5,736 and a density of 71.07 persons per km2. The total area was 80.71 km2.

Towns and villages
 Yoshii

Merger
 On March 1, 2005 - the town of Yoshii along with the town of Bisei (from Oda District), was merged into the expanded city of Ibara.

Former districts of Okayama Prefecture